East Sussex is a ceremonial and non-metropolitan county in South East England on the English Channel coast. It is bordered by Kent to the north and east, West Sussex to the west, and Surrey to the north-west. The largest settlement in East Sussex is the city of Brighton and Hove.

History

East Sussex is part of the historic county of Sussex, which has its roots in the ancient kingdom of the South Saxons, who established themselves there in the 5th century AD, after the departure of the Romans. Archaeological remains are plentiful, especially in the upland areas. The area's position on the coast has also meant that there were many invaders, including the Romans and later the Normans. Earlier industries have included fishing, iron-making, and the wool trade, all of which have declined, or been lost completely.

Governance

Sussex was historically sub-divided into six rapes. From the 12th century the three eastern rapes together and the three western rapes together had separate quarter sessions, with the county town of the three eastern rapes being Lewes. This situation was formalised by Parliament in 1865, and the two parts were made into administrative counties, each with its own elected county council in 1889 under the Local Government Act 1888. In East Sussex there were also three self-administered county boroughs: Brighton, Eastbourne and Hastings.

Upon its foundation, East Sussex included the south of Tunbridge Wells and the south of Lamberhurst; by the Local Government Act 1894 these areas were transferred to Kent.

In 1974 East Sussex was made a non-metropolitan and ceremonial county, and the three county boroughs became districts within the county. At the same time the western boundary was altered, so that the Mid Sussex region (including Burgess Hill and Haywards Heath) was transferred to the non metropolitan county of West Sussex. In 1997, Brighton and Hove became a self-administered unitary authority; it was granted city status in 2000, whilst remaining part of the ceremonial county of East Sussex.

The area of East Sussex County Council's jurisdiction is divided into five local government districts. Three are large rural districts (from west to east): Lewes, Wealden, and Rother. Eastbourne and Hastings are mainly urban areas. The rural districts are further subdivided into civil parishes.

Geography

Geology

Geologically, East Sussex is part of southern anticline of the Weald: the South Downs, a range of moderate chalk hills which run across the southern part of the county from west to east and mirrored in Kent by the North Downs. To the north lie parallel valleys and ridges, the highest of which is the Weald itself (the Hastings beds and Wealden Clay). The sandstones and clays meet the sea at Hastings; the Downs, at Beachy Head. The area contains significant reserves of shale oil, totalling 4.4 billion barrels of oil in the Wealden basin according to a 2014 study, which then Business and Energy Minister Michael Fallon said "will bring jobs and business opportunities" and significantly help with UK energy self-sufficiency. Fracking in the area is required to achieve these objectives, which has been opposed by environmental groups.

Climate
East Sussex, like most counties by the south coast, has an annual average total of around 1,750 hours of sunshine per year. This is much higher than the UK's average of about 1,340 hours of sunshine a year.

Relief and drainage
The relief of the county reflects the geology.

The chalk uplands of the South Downs occupies the coastal strip between Brighton and Eastbourne. There are two river gaps: the Rivers Ouse and Cuckmere. The Seven Sisters, where the Downs meet the sea, are the remnants of dry valleys cut into the chalk; they end at Beachy Head, 530 feet (162 m) above sea level. To the east of Beachy Head lie the marshlands of the Pevensey Levels, formerly flooded by the sea but now enclosed within a deposited beach. At Bexhill the land begins to rise again where the sands and clays of the Weald meet the sea; these culminate in the sandstone cliffs east of Hastings. Further east are the Pett Levels, more marshland, beyond which is the estuary of the River Rother. On the far side of the estuary are the dunes of Camber Sands.

The Weald occupies the northern borderlands of the county. Between the Downs and Weald is a narrow stretch of lower lying land; many of the rivers and streams occupying this area originate in the Weald. The High Weald is heavily wooded in contrast to the South Downs; the Low Weald less so. Part of the Weald is the Ashdown Forest.

Settlements

The location of settlements in East Sussex has been determined both by its history and its geography. The original towns and villages tended to be where its economy lay: fishing along the coast and agriculture and iron mining on the Weald. Industry today tends to be geared towards tourism, and particularly along the coastal strip. Here towns such as Bexhill-on-Sea, Eastbourne, and Hastings lie. Newhaven and Rye are ports, although the latter is also of historical importance. Peacehaven and Seaford are more dormitory towns than anything else. Away from the coast lie former market towns such as Hailsham, Heathfield and Uckfield; Crowborough is a centre for the Ashdown Forest. Lewes, the County town of East Sussex; and Battle, with its Norman Conquest beginnings, and Wadhurst are the other three towns of significance.

Economy and demography

This is a chart of trend of regional gross value added of the non-metropolitan county of East Sussex (Brighton & Hove has a separate table) at current basic prices published (pp. 240–253) by Office for National Statistics with figures in millions of pounds.

Landmarks

The Seven Sisters Park is part of the South Downs National Park. Beachy Head is one of the most famed local attractions, along with the flats along Normans Bay.

Apart from the physical landmarks such as the Downs and the Weald, East Sussex has a great many landmarks of historical interest. There are castles at Bodiam, Herstmonceux, Lewes and Pevensey; and defence works such as the Martello towers and Eastbourne Redoubt. Battle Abbey, built to commemorate the Battle of Hastings; Bateman's, home of Rudyard Kipling, Hammerwood Park, one of the first examples of Greek Revival architecture in the UK; and the University of Sussex buildings at Falmer are among interesting buildings. Bexhill on sea is also home to the De La Warr Pavilion. East Sussex also includes two chalk hill figures, being the Litlington White Horse and the Long Man of Wilmington, which are both situated in the Sussex Downs.

Transport

Roads

East Sussex has no motorways, and even dual carriageways are sparse in the county. The main roads through the county are those part of the radial pattern from London: the A21 from Kent to Hastings; the A22 from Surrey to Eastbourne; and the A23 from Gatwick to Brighton. Cross-country routes include the A26 which carries traffic from Newhaven and Lewes north into Kent; and the south coast trunk route, which starts in Folkestone (Kent) as the A259 trunk road, and traverses the south coast to Eastbourne, where it becomes the A27 trunk road and heads westwards towards Chichester in West Sussex and ultimately to Honiton in Devon. All the main roads suffer from congestion and traffic problems: the A27 which connects Eastbourne to Portsmouth is one of the busiest trunk roads in the UK.

Bus routes serve all the main areas of settlement and many of the villages in the county.

Railways
The railways serve the main towns in a similar fashion to the roads. Until the closures of many branch railways in the 20th century, rural East Sussex was well-served by rail: few such branch lines escaped the Beeching cuts so that today only main-line services remain. They include the East Coastway Line (including the Marshlink Line); the Hastings line; and the Uckfield branch of the Oxted Line. There are three heritage railways: the Kent and East Sussex Railway operates from Tenterden in Kent to Bodiam; the Bluebell Railway from Sheffield Park to East Grinstead; and the Lavender Line Steam Railway near Lewes.

Trains in the county are operated by Southern, Southeastern, Thameslink and Great Western Railway. Southern is the key operator for the county, operating services along the West Coastway and East Coastway routes, as well as trains from Brighton, Eastbourne, Seaford and Hastings to London Victoria, and to a lesser extent London Bridge, which is also where trains to/from Uckfield go. Southeastern operate trains from London Charing Cross to Hastings. Thameslink operate trains from Brighton to Bedford.

Footpaths

Among the long-distance footpaths in East Sussex are the South Downs Way; 1066 Country Walk, High Weald Landscape Trail, Saxon Shore Way, Sussex Border Path, Sussex Ouse Valley Way, Vanguard Way, Wealdway and The Monarch's Way.

Education

The Universities of Sussex and Brighton are based in East Sussex, with facilities in Brighton, Falmer and Hastings.

Over 150 primary schools serve the area; many of them small and local in scope.

State and independent secondary schools include Lewes Old Grammar School, which celebrated its 500th anniversary in 2012. Overall, more than 50 serve East Sussex, including further education colleges in larger towns.

A number of independent boarding schools are also located in the county, including Brighton College and Roedean. The Pestalozzi Children's Village, an international foundation, is located at Sedlescombe.

See also
Outline of England
Historic coats of arms of East Sussex County Council
History of local government in Sussex
ESCIS
List of High Sheriffs of East Sussex
List of hills of East Sussex
The Keep: the county's archive and record office, near Falmer
List of Lord Lieutenants of East Sussex
Healthcare in Sussex

References

External links

 
Images of East Sussex at the English Heritage Archive
 WW1 East Sussex, Sussex County Council
 Further historical information and sources on GENUKI

 
Counties of England established in 1974
Non-metropolitan counties